Anil Kohli is an Indian dental surgeon, medical administrator and a former president of the Dental Council of India. He is an elected fellow of the Faculty of Dental Surgery of the Royal College of Surgeons of England and holds the honorary rank of 'Brigadier' in the Army Dental Corps. He is a recipient of B. C. Roy Award, the highest Indian award in the medical category. The Government of India awarded him the fourth highest civilian honor of the Padma Shri in 1992 and followed it up with the third highest civilian honour of the Padma Bhushan, in 2005, for his contributions to medicine, making him the first dentist to receive both the honors.

Biography 
Anil Kohli, an alumnus of King George's Medical College, Lucknow from where secured his graduate degree in medicine and postgraduate degree in dental sciences, received the S. S. Bhatnagar Award during his student days from his alma mater. He is a former Dean of Dentistry at the Baba Farid University of Health Sciences and an adjunct professor at Tufts University School of Dental Medicine. In 1992, when he received the Padma Shri award, he became the first dentist to receive the honor. The Government of India honored him again in 2005 with the higher Padma honor of the Padma Bhushan; two years later, he received the B. C. Roy Award, the highest Indian medical award. He was associated with the Dental Council of India as a member of the executive committee from 2001 to 2004 when he was elected as its president, a post he held for two tenancies, 2004–2005 and 2009–2010.

Works and Contributions 
Anil Kohli served as the dentist surgeon to Presidents of India more than 20 years. He served as dentist to the Prime Ministers of India.  He is presently editor- in- chief Indian Journal of Dental Research and representative of Asia in world body of Endodontics IFEA. He received fellowship from all the three Royal College of Surgeons , Glasgow, Edinburgh and England. He has also received more than 10 Doctorate from different Universities of the world. Dr. Anil Kohli was honoured at oral cancer fundraising event on October 6, 2018, at the River Rock Casino Resort in Richmond.

Controversy 
In 2010, corruption charges appeared against Kohli in the media, which he refuted. Subsequently, the Central Bureau of Investigation raided Kohli's home and office and filed a case against him for holding disproportionate assets. However, the case was closed after nine months of investigations by the agency, exonerating Kohli from the charges.

See also 
 Dental Council of India
 King George's Medical University

References

External links 
 

Recipients of the Padma Bhushan in medicine
Recipients of the Padma Shri in medicine
Year of birth missing (living people)
Dr. B. C. Roy Award winners
Indian dentists
Indian medical writers
Indian medical academics
Fellows of the Royal College of Surgeons
Tufts University faculty
Living people
Place of birth missing (living people)
20th-century Indian medical doctors
King George's Medical University alumni
University of Lucknow alumni